The Archdiocese of Reims (traditionally spelt "Rheims" in English) (French: Archidiocèse de Reims) is a Latin Church ecclesiastic territory or archdiocese of the Catholic Church in France. Erected as a diocese around 250 by St. Sixtus of Reims, the diocese was elevated to an archdiocese around 750. The archbishop received the title "primate of Gallia Belgica" in 1089.

In 1023, Archbishop Ebles acquired the Countship of Reims, making him a prince-bishop; it became a duchy and a peerage between 1060 and 1170.

The archdiocese comprises the arrondissement of Reims and the département of Ardennes while the province comprises the former région of Champagne-Ardenne. The suffragan dioceses in the ecclesiastical province of Reims are Amiens; Beauvais, Noyon, and Senlis; Châlons; Langres; Soissons, Laon, and Saint-Quentin; and Troyes. The archepiscopal see is located in the cathedral of Notre-Dame de Reims, where the Kings of France were traditionally crowned. In 2014 it was estimated that there was one priest for every 4,760 Catholics in the diocese.

Pope Francis appointed Éric de Moulins-Beaufort Archbishop of Reims in 2018.

History

Reims was taken by the Vandals in 406.

According to Flodoard, on Holy Saturday, 497, Clovis was baptized and anointed by Archbishop Remigius of Reims in the cathedral of Reims.

In 719 the city took up arms against Charles Martel, who besieged the city, took it by assault, and devastated it.

In 816, Pope Stephen IV crowned Louis the Pious as Emperor at Reims.

On 28 January 893, Charles III "the Simple' was crowned King of West Francia at Reims.

King Robert I was consecrated and crowned 'Rex Francorum' at Saint-Remi in Reims on 29 June 922 by Archbishop Hervée.

Hugh Capet was crowned at Reims on Christmas Day 988, by Archbishop Adalberon.  In 990 the city was attacked by Charles of Lorraine, the rival of Hugues Capet, who seized the city and devastated the area.

Councils of Reims
The First Council of Reims took place in 625, under the presidency of Archbishop Sonnatius. It produced at least twenty-five canons.

In 1049, from 3 to 5 October, a Council of the Church took place at Reims under the presidency of Pope Leo IX, with twenty bishops and some fifty abbots in attendance.  The Pope was in Reims for the dedication of the church of the monastery of Saint-Rémi, in fulfilment of a promise made to Abbot Herimar.

Cathedral chapter
In 1657, the chapter of the Cathedral of Reims contained nine dignities and sixty-four canons.  The dignities included the major archdeacon (Archdeacon of Reims), the minor archdeacon (Archdeacon of Champagne), the provost, the dean, the cantor, the treasurer, the vicedominus, the scholasticus, and the poenitentiarius. There were also a number of collegiate churches in the diocese, whose clergy were led by canons:  Saint-Symphorien in Reims (a dean and 20 prebends); Saint-Timothée in Reims (12 prebends); Saint-Côme in Reims (4 prebends); Sainte-Nourrice in Reims (11 prebends); Saint-Pierre aux Dames in Reims (4 prebends); Mézières (a dean, a treasurer and 12 prebends); Braux (12 prebends); Montfaucon (a provost and canons); and Avenay (6 prebends).

The two archdeacons were already in existence in 877, when they are mentioned at the head of the Capitulations issued by Archbishop Hincmar.  They were both appointees of the archbishop.

In addition to the right to nominate the archbishop of Reims (since the Concordat of Bologna in 1516), the King enjoyed the right to name the abbot of Haut-Villiers (O.S.B.), Sainte-Baste (O.S.B.), Mouson (O.S.B.), Saint-Nicaise de Reims (O.S.B.), Saint-Pierre-de-Reims (O.S.B.), Saint-Remi de Reims (O.S.B.), Saint-Thierry lez Reims (O.S.B.), Chery (O.Cist.), Elem (O.Cist.), Igny (O.Cist.), Signy (O.Cist.), Vau-le-Roy (O.Cist.), Saint-Denis-de-Reims (O.S.A.), Esparnay-sur-Marne (O.S.A.), Belle-Val (Praemonst.), Chaumont en Porcien (Praemonst.), Sept Fontaines (Praemonst.), and Vau-Dieu (Praemonst.).

Bishops and archbishops

Bishops of Reims

 St. Sixtus (c. 260)
 St. Sinicius (Sinice) (c. 280)
 St. Amantius (Amanse) (c. 290)
 Imbetausius (before 300–c. 314)
 Aprus (Aper) (328–350)
 Maternianus (350–359)
 Donatianus (361–390)
 Viventius (390–394)
 Severus (394–400)
 Nicasius of Rheims (probably 400–407 but perhaps ?-451)
 Barucius
 Barnabas
 Bennagius (?–459)
 Saint Remigius (Remi) (459–533)
 Romanus (c. 533-535)
 Flavius (c. 535)
 Mappinus (c. 549)
 Egidius (573–590) 
 Romulph (590–613) 
 Sonnatius (613–c. 627) 
 Leudigisil
 Angelbert (c. 630)
 Lando  
 Nivard (before 657–673)
 Reolus (673–c. 689)
 Rigobert (c. 689 – after 720)
 Milo (715–744)
 Abel (c. 743/744–748)

Archbishops of Reims

To 1000

 Tilpin (748–795)
 vacant (795–812)
 Wulfaire (812–816)
 Ebbo (816–835)
 vacant (835–840)
 Ebbo (840–841), again
 vacant (841–845)
 Hincmar (845–882)
 Fulk the Venerable (882–900)
 Hervaeus (900–922)
 Seulf (922–925)
 Hugh of Vermandois (925–931)
 Artaud (931–940) 
 Hugh of Vermandois (940–946), again
 Artaud (946–961), again
 Odelric (962–969)
 Adalberon (969–988)
 Arnoul (988–991; son of Lothair of France)
 Gerbert of Aurillac (991–996); later Pope Sylvester II
 Arnoul (996–1021), again

1000–1300

 Ebles I of Roucy (1021–1033; count of Roucy, count of Reims, 1023–1033)
 Guy of Châtillon (1033–1055)
 Gervaise of Bellême (1055–1067)
 Manasses I (1069–1080)
 Renaud du Bellay (1083–1096)
 Manasses II (1096–1106)
 Gervaise of Rethel (1106)
 Raoul le Vert (1106–1124)
 Rainaldus de Martigny (1125–1138)
 Samson de Mauvoisin (1140–1161)
 Henry (1162–1175; son of Louis VI of France)
 Guillaume de Blois (Guillaume aux Blanches Mains)  (1176–1202)
 Guy Paré (1204 – 30 July 1206)
 Albericus de Humbert (1207 – 24 December 1218)
 Guillaume de Joinville (24 April 1219 – 6 November 1226)
 Henry of Dreux (18 April 1227 – 6 July 1240)
 Juhel de Mathefelon (20 March 1245 – 18 December 1250)
 Thomas de Beaumes (4 March 1251 – 15 February 1263)
 Jean de Courtenay-Champignelles (15 July 1266 – 17 August 1270)
 Pierre Barbet (17 April 1273 – 3 October 1298)
 Robert de Courtenay-Champignelles (10 April 1299 – 3 March 1324)

1300–1500

 Guillaume de Trie (1324–1334)
 Jean de Vienne (1335–1351)
 Hugues d'Arcy (1351–1352)
 Humbert, O.P. (1352–1355) (Administrator)
 Jean de Craon (1355–1373)
 Louis Thesart (14 April 1374 – 12 October 1375)
 Richard Picque (12 November 1375 – 6 December 1389)
 Ferry Cassinel (29 January 1390 – 26 May 1390) (Avignon Obedience)
 Guy de Roye (1391–1409)
 Simon of Cramaud (2 July 1409 – 1413)
 Pierre Trousseau (2 May 1413 - 16 December 1413)
 Renaud of Chartres (2 January 1414 – 1444)
 Jacques Juvenal des Ursins (9 October 1444 – 3 March 1449)
 Jean Juvenal des Ursins (3 March 1449 – 14 July 1473)
 Pierre de Montfort-Laval (1474–1493)
 Robert Briçonnet (1493–1497)
 Guillaume Briçonnet (1497–1507)

1500–1800

 Cardinal Charles Dominique de Carreto (16 September 1507 – 28 March 1509)
 Cardinal Robert de Lenoncourt (28 March 1509 – 25 September 1532)
 Cardinal Jean de Lorraine (1533–1550) 
 Charles of Guise (1538–1574)
 Cardinal Louis I of Guise (1574–1588)
 Cardinal Nicolas de Pellevé (1588–1594)
 Philippe du Bec (1594–1605)
 Cardinal Louis II of Guise (1605–1621) 
 Gabriel de Sainte-Marie OSB (William Gifford) (1623–1629)
 Henry of Guise (1629–1641) 
 Léonore d'Étampes de Valençay (1641–1651)
 Henri de Savoie (1651–1659)
 Cardinal Antonio Barberini (1657/1667 – 4 August 1671)
 Charles Maurice Le Tellier (1668/1671 – 22 February 1710)
 François de Mailly (1 December 1710 – 13 September 1721)
 Armand Jules de Rohan-Guéméné (6 July 1722 – 28 August 1762)
 Charles Antoine de La Roche-Aymon (1763–1777)
 Alexandre-Angélique de Talleyrand-Périgord  (1777–1816)

From 1800
 vacant
 Jean-Charles de Coucy (1817–1824)
 Jean-Baptist-Marie-Anne-Antoine de Latil (1824–1839)
 Thomas-Marie-Joseph Gousset (1840–1866)
 Jean-Baptiste François Anne Thomas Landriot (1867–1874)
 Benoit-Marie Langénieux (1874–1905)
 Louis Luçon (1906–1930)
 Emmanuel Célestin Suhard (1930–1940)
 Louis-Augustin Marmottin (1940–1960)
 Gabriel Auguste François Marty (1960–1968)
 Émile André Jean-Marie Maury (1968–1972)
 Jacques Eugène Louis Ménager (1973–1988)
 Jean Marie Julien Balland (1988–1995)
 Gérard Defois (1995–1998)
 Thierry Jordan (1999–2018)
 Éric de Moulins-Beaufort (2018–present)

Auxiliary bishops
Abel de Saint-Brieuc (1483)

See also
 Catholic Church in France
 Council of Reims

References

Sources

Episcopal lists
  (Use with caution; obsolete)
  (in Latin) 
 (in Latin) 
 
 

 

Fasti Ecclesiae Gallicanae: Repertoire prosopographique des évêques, dignitaires et chanoines de France de 1200 a 1500. Vol. 3. Diocèse de Reims. Turnhout: Brepols, 1998.

Studies
Anselme. Histoire Généalogique et Chronologique des Pairs de France. Vol. 2.
Boussinecq, Georges and Laurent, Gustave. Histoire de Reims des origines jusqu'à nos jours. 1933. 

Cusimano, Richard, ed., and Suger, Abbot of Saint Denis. The Deeds of Louis the Fat. Washington, D.C.: Catholic University of America Press, 1992.
Histoire de Reims. Pierre Desportes, ed. 1983. .
 (in French)

For further reading

External links
  Centre national des Archives de l'Église de France, L'Épiscopat francais depuis 1919, retrieved: 2016-12-24. 
 
Diocese of Reims at catholic-hierarchy.org 

Roman Catholic dioceses in France
Reims
Dioceses established in the 3rd century
3rd-century establishments in Roman Gaul